Sarai Tarin  is a locality in Sambhal. Sarai Tarin is 4 km away from Sambhal city but is included in Sambhal.

Sarai Tarin is famous for its craft. Here Many things related to Handicraft are manufactured which are exported to many European countries. Specially Horn, Bone, wooden , and Raisin items like jewellery,  photo frame , decorative items are made here. Saraitarin gave many chairman to the Tehseel Sambhal.

See also
 Sambhal
 Mahatma Gandhi Memorial Post Graduate College
 Government Degree College Sambhal

References

Sambhal district
Caravanserais in India